Autorsha is a 2018 Indian Malayalam-language comedy film directed and filmed by Sujith Vaassudev, and starring Anusree as a female auto rickshaw driver.

Plot
Anitha makes her living as an auto driver in Kannur. Her auto rickshaw adventures with passengers, as she travels around Kannur forms the crux of the story. Anitha buys a new auto rickshaw and goes about her life. Her day to day life in the auto stand is shown but nothing is shown about her family or her house. During a wedding, Anitha meets her classmate and both of them rekindles their friendship. From there flashback shows that Anitha is actually Haseena and she had a loving family. She falls in love with an auto driver named Manoj and wants to marry him. Her father is against this, so they elope to Mangalore taking the gold her father had saved for her future. In Mangalore they rent a house and decide to sell the gold and start a bakery business. While they come home, they realise that their house has been robbed. Going to police also does not help. In a few days Manoj deserts her, and from the neighbors she learns that he has cheated many girls like this and he has planned the robbery. Disheartened she goes back to her home and father, where her sister is due getting married in a week. Fearing another scandal due to her return, her whole family kills themselves. Haseena unable to go on with her life decides to kill herself but changes her mind. She does many small jobs and saves enough money to buy an auto rickshaw, changes her name to Anitha, and starts a living. 

One of her acquaintance, Shyam hosts a birthday party for his daughter and Anitha offers to cater for the function. There she sees Manoj as a guest who is also the partner of Shyam. Anitha had known that Manoj and Shyam are partners from the picture in Shyam's office and also seen them together from a previous job as a toll booth employee. She confronts him when no one is around, but he scorns her telling she is just a woman, and he aint afraid of her. He even goes to the extent and says that he will keep doing what he did to her to other girls, and his current marriage is also a sham. She then fatally poisons him. A content Anitha is seen driving off in her auto rickshaw singing to herself.

Cast
Anusree as Anitha / Haseena
Rahul Madhav as Manoj
Sankar Induchoodan as Rahul 
Tini Tom as Sub Inspector
Naseer Sankranthi
Sunil Surya as Santhosh
Rashid Naseer as Abbas 
Amar Vikas
Dr Amar Ramachandran
Sivadas Kannur as Shanthettan
Shafeer Khan as Shyam
Subeesh Sudhi
Manju Pillai

Production

Autorsha is the second directorial of cinematographer Sujith Vaassudev after James & Alice (2016). It was scripted by Jayaraj Mithra, the creator of the satirical TV series Marimayam. The filming began on 7 March 2018 in Kannur, Kerala.

References

External links
 Sujith Vaassudev at the Internet Movie Database
 Official Facebook Page

2018 films
Films scored by Sharreth
2010s Malayalam-language films
Indian comedy films
2018 comedy films